The 2009–10 Alabama Crimson Tide men's basketball team (variously "Alabama", "UA", "Bama" or "The Tide") represented the University of Alabama in the 2009–10 college basketball season. The head coach was Anthony Grant, who was in his first year. The team played its home games at Coleman Coliseum in Tuscaloosa, Alabama and was a member of the Southeastern Conference. This was the 97th season of basketball in the school's history. The Crimson Tide finished the season 17–15, 6–10 in SEC play, lost in the quarterfinals of the 2010 SEC men's basketball tournament and were not invited to a post season tournament.

Roster

Schedule and results

|-
!colspan=12 style="background:#990000; color:#FFFFFF;"| Exhibition
|-

|-
!colspan=12 style="background:#990000; color:#FFFFFF;"| Regular season – non-conference play

|-
!colspan=12 style="background:#990000; color:#FFFFFF;"| Regular season – conference play

|-
!colspan=12 style="background:#990000; color:#FFFFFF;"| 2010 SEC men's basketball tournament

See also
2010 NCAA Men's Division I Basketball Tournament
2009–10 NCAA Division I men's basketball season
2009–10 NCAA Division I men's basketball rankings

References

Alabama
Alabama Crimson Tide men's basketball seasons
2010 in sports in Alabama
Alabama Crimson Tide